La Sagra is a Castilian comarca delineated by natural formations but not legally recognized. The comarca includes localities belonging to both the province of Madrid and the province of Toledo. La Sagra covers an area of 1322 km2, and is bordered by the Guadarrama River and the Tagus.

Municipalities of Toledo

Municipalities of Madrid 
 Batres
 Casarrubuelos 
 Ciempozuelos 
 Cubas de la Sagra 
 Griñón 
 Serranillos 
 Torrejón de la Calzada 
 Torrejón de Velasco 
 Valdemoro

Borders and Geography 
The exact geographic boundaries of La Sagra are not clearly defined. It is understood, however, that the comarca encompasses parts of the municipal district of Toledo, above all the neighborhood of Azucaica. According to information provided by the Diputaciones Provinciales of Madrid  and Toledo, these municipal districts are the only ones considered to be a part of the comarca.

The high, flat ground of La Sagra is part of the Submeseta Sur, and averages approximately 600 meters in altitude. The region has been experiencing a large population growth in the past few decades due to its proximity to the capital.

The majority of the fertile land of La Sagra is dedicated to the cultivation of cereals. Due to high clay content in the subsoil, a large part of all industrial activity is dedicated to ceramics, especially bricks and tiles. The area also supports a number of other specialized industries, and is home to a large number of industrial parks.

Bibliography

External links 
Comarca de La Sagra, según la Diputación de Toledo (Spanish)

Comarcas of Castilla–La Mancha
Comarcas of the Community of Madrid
Geography of the Province of Toledo